Wendell Phillip Chavous Jr. (born February 28, 1985) is an American former professional stock car racing driver and current entrepreneur. He last competed part-time in the NASCAR Camping World Truck Series, driving both the Nos. 15 and 49 Chevrolet Silverados for Premium Motorsports. He has also driven for MAKE Motorsports and Mike Harmon Racing in the NCWTS.

Chavous is also the owner of Steel Barn Truss, a manufacturing business that makes barn trusses.

Racing career

Early years
Chavous made a name racing late models on dirt tracks, including appearances at the Fastrak Grand Nationals.

Camping World Truck Series
Driving for Mike Harmon, Chavous made his first Truck start in the 2014 Kroger 200, starting last in the 36-truck field but making his way up to 27th. Two weeks later at Phoenix International Raceway, Chavous finished in the same spot in Harmon's No. 74, albeit more than 30 laps down. Switching to MAKE Motorsports for the season-ending Ford EcoBoost 200 a week later, Chavous fell out with electrical problems and finished 31st. After running sporadically in Premium Motorsports' No. 94 for the beginning part of 2015, the team and Chavous announced at Eldora Speedway that he would pilot the truck for the rest of the season. However, the deal fell through, with Chavous running only the next three races. His best finish was a sixteenth before the announcement at Kansas Speedway. He ran seven races on the season.

On February 13, 2017, Premium Motorsports announced that Chavous would compete for 2017 Truck Series Rookie of the Year driving the team's No. 49 entry. Chavous ran the full schedule, except Mosport and Phoenix where he was replaced by Gary Klutt, and Robby Lyons, respectively. He scored a career-best finish of 14th at Las Vegas Motor Speedway in the fall.

On January 29, 2018, it was announced that Chavous would return to Premium's No. 49 entry for another full-time effort in 2018. Brian Keselowski returned as crew chief. As part of the announcement, addiction help nonprofit Sobriety Nation signed on as sponsor for the entire season. The pairing yielded four top-fifteen efforts, up from one the previous year, although Keselowski departed the team in late spring. On October 8, 2018, Chavous announced his departure from Premium and NASCAR, effective following the October 14 race at Talladega Superspeedway, citing the need for more family time and business ventures as the reasons to step away. He ended his career with a fifth-place outing in the race.

Personal life
Chavous is married and has a son, who races go-karts. He owns the business Steel Barn Truss, a barn truss manufacturing company.

Motorsports career results

NASCAR
(key) (Bold – Pole position awarded by time. Italics – Pole position earned by points standings or practice time. * – Most laps led.)

Camping World Truck Series

K&N Pro Series West

 Season still in progress
 Ineligible for series driver points

References

External links
 
 Steel Barn Truss website

Living people
1985 births
NASCAR drivers
People from Hephzibah, Georgia
Racing drivers from Georgia (U.S. state)
Sportspeople from Georgia (U.S. state)
21st-century American businesspeople
Businesspeople from Georgia (U.S. state)